PVZ or PvZ may refer to:

 Party for Zeeland, a provincial political party in the province of Zeeland in the Netherlands
 Plants vs. Zombies, a video game franchise developed by PopCap Games
 Plants vs. Zombies (video game), a 2009 tower defense video game and the first game of the video game series
 Póvoa de Varzim, a Portuguese city in the Norte Region and sub-region of Greater Porto
 Paige VanZant, an American mixed martial artist

See also
PVC, a chemical